The 57th Annual Tony Awards was held at Radio City Music Hall on June 8, 2003, and broadcast by CBS television. The event was hosted for the first time by Australian actor Hugh Jackman.

The ceremony
The ceremony was broadcast on national prime time television on CBS for three hours, rather than two hours on CBS and one hour on PBS, as had been done for several years previously. The television ratings were 5.4, down slightly from the 2002 telecast of 5.9. During the ceremony, at the end of their acceptance speech for Hairspray, Marc Shaiman and Scott Wittman kissed each other, making them the first public same-sex kiss at an awards show, predating Britney Spears and Madonna at the MTV Video Music Awards.

Presenters included: Benjamin Bratt, Toni Braxton, Matthew Broderick, Alan Cumming, Edie Falco, Joey Fatone, Laurence Fishburne, Sutton Foster, Danny Glover, Melanie Griffith, Frank Langella, John Leguizamo, John Lithgow, Julianna Margulies, Bebe Neuwirth, Sarah Jessica Parker, Rosie Perez, Lynn Redgrave, Vanessa Redgrave, Christopher Reeve, Ann Reinking, John Spencer, Marisa Tomei, Mike Wallace and Barbara Walters. In addition, Jason Alexander and Martin Short, the stars of the national company of The Producers, presented an award from the stage of Pantages Theatre in Los Angeles.

There were memorial tributes to cartoonist Al Hirschfeld, writer Peter Stone, and lyricist Adolph Green.

Shows that performed were:

New Musicals:
Movin' Out - Billy Joel opened by performing "New York State of Mind" live from Times Square, leading to a medley of "River of Dreams", "Keeping the Faith" and "Only the Good Die Young" performed by the company of Movin' Out on stage at Radio City Music Hall.
Hairspray - Marissa Jaret Winokur, Matthew Morrison, Kerry Butler, Harvey Fierstein, and Mary Bond Davis led the company with "You Can't Stop the Beat"
A Year with Frog and Toad - Mark Linn-Baker and Jay Goede performed "Alone"

Revivals:
Nine - Antonio Banderas performed "Guido's Song" with the company
La bohème - The company (including all 10 members of the principal ensemble) performed a medley from the opera
Gypsy - Bernadette Peters performed "Rose's Turn"
Man of La Mancha - Brian Stokes Mitchell performed "The Impossible Dream (The Quest)" with Mary Elizabeth Mastrantonio

Awards and nominees
Winners are in bold

Source:The New York Times

Special awards
Tony Honors for Excellence in Theatre
The principal ensemble of La bohème, including Mimis Lisa Hopkins, Ekaterina Solovyeva and Wei Huang; Rodolfos David Miller, Jesús Garcia and Alfie Boe; Musettas Jessica Comeau and Chlöe Wright; and Marcellos Eugene Brancoveanu and Ben Davis
Paul Huntley
Johnson-Liff Casting Associates
The Acting Company

Lifetime Achievement Tony Award
Cy Feuer

Special Theatrical Event
Russell Simmons' Def Poetry Jam on Broadway

Regional Theatre Tony Award
Children's Theatre Company (Minneapolis, MN)

Multiple nominations and awards

These productions had multiple nominations:

13 nominations: Hairspray  
10 nominations: Movin' Out 
8 nominations: Nine
7 nominations: La bohème and Long Day's Journey into Night 
5 nominations: Amour and Dinner at Eight 
4 nominations: A Day in the Death of Joe Egg, Gypsy and Take Me Out
3 nominations: Flower Drum Song, Man of La Mancha and A Year with Frog and Toad 
2 nominations: Enchanted April, Frankie and Johnny in the Clair de Lune, Medea, Tartuffe, Urban Cowboy and Vincent in Brixton       

The following productions received multiple awards.

8 wins: Hairspray
3 wins: La bohème, Long Day's Journey into Night and Take Me Out 
2 wins: Movin' Out and Nine

See also
 Drama Desk Awards
 2003 Laurence Olivier Awards – equivalent awards for West End theatre productions
 Obie Award
 New York Drama Critics' Circle
 Theatre World Award
 Lucille Lortel Awards

Notes
The thirty composers nominated for Urban Cowboy were Jeff Blumenkrantz, Bob Stillman, Jason Robert Brown, Danny Arena, Sara Light, Lauren Lucas, Jerry Silverstein, Martie Maguire, Wayland D. Holyfield, Bob Lee House, Carl L. Byrd, Pevin Byrd-Munoz, Luke Reed, Roger Brown, Jerry Chesnut, Marcus Hummon, Clint Black, James Hayden Nicholas, Tommy Conners, Skip Ewing, Charles Daniels, Tom Crain, Fred Edwards, Taz DiGregorio, Jim Marshall, Charlie Hayward, Wanda Mallette, Patti Ryan, Ronnie Dunn and Bob Morrison.

References

External links
Tony Awards Official Site

Tony Awards ceremonies
2003 in theatre
2003 theatre awards
Tony
2003 in New York City
2000s in Manhattan
Television shows directed by Glenn Weiss